Dracontomelon schmidii is a tree species in the family Anacardiaceae; no subspecies are listed in the Catalogue of Life.  It is found in northern Việt Nam, where it may be called long cóc Schmid.

References

Flora of Indo-China
Trees of Vietnam
schmidii